Jonet is a surname. Notable people with the surname include:

William Jonet (fl. 1381–1388), MP
Marie Jonet Dugès (1730–1797), French midwife